Boško Mihajlović (Serbian Cyrillic: Бошко Михајловић; born October 10, 1971) is a Serbian former footballer.

Mihajlović started his career in FK Proleter Zrenjanin in 1992. He played 6 seasons for Proleter (1992-1997) and then one and a half season for Panachaiki F.C. from Greece. After two seasons in Greece he moved to Serbia again to sign for FK Rad. He stayed in Rad for two seasons when he moved again to Proleter.

In 2002, he suffers injury and retires from Proleter. Two years later and he returns to football, this time as player-manager for semi-professional club FK Mladost Lukićevo. Finally, in 2006 he moved to FK Naftagas Elemir where he retires from football in 2010.

References
   at FSG Zrenjanin

1971 births
Living people
Sportspeople from Zrenjanin
Serbian footballers
FK Proleter Zrenjanin players
Panachaiki F.C. players
FK Rad players
Super League Greece players
Serbian expatriate footballers
Expatriate footballers in Greece
Serbian expatriate sportspeople in Greece
Association football forwards